ISHS may refer to:
 Idaho State Historical Society
 Indooroopilly State High School
 Innisfail State High School
 International Society for Horticultural Science
 International Society for Humor Studies
 Islamic State Health Service